The Heaviside condition, named for Oliver Heaviside (1850–1925), is the condition an electrical transmission line must meet in order for there to be no distortion of a transmitted signal.  Also known as the distortionless condition, it can be used to improve the performance of a transmission line by adding loading to the cable.

The condition

A transmission line can be represented as a distributed-element model of its primary line constants as shown in the figure.  The primary constants are the electrical properties of the cable per unit length and are: capacitance C (in farads per meter), inductance L (in henries per meter), series resistance R (in ohms per meter), and shunt conductance G (in siemens per meter). The series resistance and shunt conductivity cause losses in the line; for an ideal transmission line, . 

The Heaviside condition is satisfied when

This condition is for no distortion, but not for no loss.

Background
A signal on a transmission line can become distorted even if the line constants, and the resulting transmission function, are all perfectly linear.  There are two mechanisms: firstly, the attenuation of the line can vary with frequency which results in a change to the shape of a pulse transmitted down the line.  Secondly, and usually more problematically, distortion is caused by a frequency dependence on phase velocity of the transmitted signal frequency components.  If different frequency components of the signal are transmitted at different velocities the signal becomes "smeared out" in space and time, a form of distortion called dispersion.

This was a major problem on the first transatlantic telegraph cable and led to the theory of the causes of dispersion being investigated first by Lord Kelvin and then by Heaviside who discovered how it could be countered.  Dispersion of telegraph pulses, if severe enough, will cause them to overlap with adjacent pulses, causing what is now called intersymbol interference.  To prevent intersymbol interference it was necessary to reduce the transmission speed of the transatlantic telegraph cable to the equivalent of  baud.  This is an exceptionally slow data transmission rate, even for human operators who had great difficulty operating a morse key that slowly. 

For voice circuits (telephone) the frequency response distortion is usually more important than dispersion whereas digital signals are highly susceptible to dispersion distortion.  For any kind of analogue image transmission such as video or facsimile both kinds of distortion need to be eliminated.

Derivation
The transmission function of a transmission line is defined in terms of its input and output voltages when correctly terminated (that is, with no reflections) as

where  represents distance from the transmitter in meters and

are the secondary line constants, α being the attenuation in nepers per metre and β being the phase change constant in radians per metre.  For no distortion, α is required to be independent of the angular frequency ω, while β must be proportional to ω.  This requirement for proportionality to frequency is due to the relationship between the velocity, v, and phase constant, β being given by,

and the requirement that phase velocity, v, be constant at all frequencies.

The relationship between the primary and secondary line constants is given by

 

which has to be of the form  in order to meet the distortionless condition.  The only way this can be so is if  and  differ by no more than a real constant factor.  Since both have a real and imaginary part, the real and imaginary parts must independently be related by the same factor, so that;

and the Heaviside condition is proved.

Line characteristics
The secondary constants of a line meeting the Heaviside condition are consequently, in terms of the primary constants:

Attenuation,

  nepers/metre

Phase change constant,

  radians/metre

Phase velocity,

  metres/second

Characteristic impedance
The characteristic impedance of a lossy transmission line is given by

In general, it is not possible to impedance match this transmission line at all frequencies with any finite network of discrete elements because such networks are rational functions of jω, but in general the expression for characteristic impedance is irrational due to the square root term.  However, for a line which meets the Heaviside condition, there is a common factor in the fraction which cancels out the frequency dependent terms leaving,

which is a real number, and independent of frequency. The line can therefore be impedance-matched with just a resistor at either end.

Practical use

A real line, especially one using modern synthetic insulators, will have a G that is very low and will usually not come anywhere close to meeting the Heaviside condition.  The normal situation is that

To make a line meet the Heaviside condition one of the four primary constants needs to be adjusted and the question is which one.  G could be increased, but this is highly undesirable since increasing G will increase the loss.  Decreasing R is sending the loss in the right direction, but this is still not usually a satisfactory solution.  R must be decreased by a large fraction and to do this the conductor cross-sections must be increased dramatically.  This not only makes the cable much more bulky but also adds significantly to the amount of copper (or other metal) being used and hence the cost.  Decreasing the capacitance also makes the cable more bulky (since the insulation must now be thicker) but is not so costly as increasing the copper content.  This leaves increasing L which is the usual solution adopted.

The required increase in L is achieved by loading the cable with a metal with high magnetic permeability.  It is also possible to load a cable of conventional construction by adding discrete loading coils at regular intervals.  This is not identical to a distributed loading, the difference being that with loading coils there is distortionless transmission up to a definite cut-off frequency beyond which the attenuation increases rapidly.

Loading cables to meet the Heaviside condition is no longer a common practice. Instead, regularly spaced digital repeaters are now placed in long lines to maintain the desired shape and duration of pulses for long-distance transmission.

See also
 Maxwell's equations
 Telegrapher's equations

References

Bibliography
 Nahin, Paul J, Oliver Heaviside: The Life, Work, and Times of an Electrical Genius of the Victorian Age, JHU Press, 2002 . See especially pp. 231-232.
 Schroeder, Manfred Robert, Fractals, Chaos, Power Laws, Courier Corporation, 2012 .

Transmission lines